Thomas Segun Ilube  (born July 1963) is a British entrepreneur and educational philanthropist and chair of the Rugby Football Union making him the first black chair of a major sport in England. He was ranked first in the Powerlist 2017, an annual listing of the UK's 100 most powerful people with African or Afro-Caribbean heritage.

Early life
Ilube was educated at Teddington School, in Richmond-upon-Thames and Edo College in Benin City, Nigeria, followed by a bachelor's degree in physics from the University of Benin. He later received a master's degree in business administration from London's Cass Business School.

Career
Ilube was chief information officer (CIO) for the internet bank Egg.

Ilube founded the Hammersmith Academy, a state secondary school in Hammersmith, west London, which opened in September 2011 and has become one of the UK's "most innovative technology schools".

He created and launched Noddle, a credit reference service, in his time as MD of consumer markets at CallCredit Information Group. In 2005 Ilube co-founded Garlik, the online identity company sold to Experian in 2011 He is the founder and CEO of Crossword Cybersecurity plc, which was admitted to the Alternative Investment Market (AIM) on the London Stock Exchange in December 2018.

Ilube was a non-executive director of the BBC, from April 2017, stepping down in June 2021 to take up the role of chair of the Rugby Football Union (RFU), and a non-executive director of FTSE100 company WPP plc, the world’s largest advertising company by revenue, effective October 2020.

Charity
Ilube is the chair and founder of the African Gifted Foundation, a UK education charity focused on science and technology in Africa. They recently launched the African Science Academy, Africa's first all-girls science and maths academy. He was chair of Ada, the National College for Digital Skills. which opened in 2016 as the first brand new UK further education college in 23 years.

Ilube provided the prize money for the Nommo Awards for African science fiction and speculative fiction, announced at the Ake Book Festival in 2016.

Recognition
He was the first recipient of the City Livery Club centenary "Root and Branch" Award in 2014, presented by The Princess Royal. Ilube was awarded an honorary doctorate by the University of Wolverhampton in 2005.

In October 2016, Ilube was named by Powerlist as the most influential black person in the UK after topping the annual list of the 100 most powerful people of African and African Caribbean heritage in Britain.

Ilube received the 2017 Beacon Award for innovation in philanthropy. and in the same year, New African magazine listed Ilube as one of Africa's most influential people.

In 2018, Ilube was awarded an honorary doctorate by City University, London, and was appointed a Commander of the Order of the British Empire (CBE) in the 2018 Birthday Honours for services to Technology and Philanthropy.

In 2018, Ilube was elected an advisory fellow of St Anne's College, Oxford, and subsequently elected an honorary fellow in 2021. In 2020 he was elected an honorary fellow of Jesus College, Oxford. Ilube was awarded honorary doctorates by the University of Benin in 2021, the University of Portsmouth in 2022 and Coventry University in 2022.

In October 2021, Ilube appeared on BBC Radio 4's Desert Island Discs.

References

1963 births
Living people
People from Richmond, London
University of Benin (Nigeria) alumni
Alumni of Bayes Business School
BBC Board members
British chief executives
English people of Nigerian descent
British philanthropists
Chief information officers